Clément Berardo (born 11 July 1986) is a French professional golfer.

Berardo earned his 2016 European Tour card by finishing 22nd at qualifying school.

After three rounds of the 2016 Trophée Hassan II, Berardo was tied for second and finished tied for third.

Team appearances
Amateur
European Amateur Team Championship (representing France): 2010

See also
2015 European Tour Qualifying School graduates

References

External links

French male golfers
European Tour golfers
Sportspeople from Auxerre
1986 births
Living people
21st-century French people